Oxycera fallenii, the Irish major, is a Palearctic species of soldier fly.
 The body length is 7.0 to 9.0.mm. The abdomen has three pairs of yellow spots, in addition to a yellow base and tip. Longitudinal stripes on the  mesonotum  are not connected with the yellow
humeral spot. The legs are entirely yellow. This species is found in South European USSR East to Siberia and Western Europe to Ireland, Central Europe, South Europe and Turkey.

References

Stratiomyidae
Taxa named by Rasmus Carl Stæger
Diptera of Europe
Insects described in 1844